Før frostnettene (English: Before the Frosts) is a 1966 Norwegian drama film directed by Arnljot Berg. It is based on Sigurd Hoel's 1935 novel Fjorten dager før frostnettene (Fourteen Days before the Frosts) and it premiered on January 17, 1966. The music for the film was composed by Egil Monn-Iversen.

Plot
Knut Holmen is celebrating his 40th birthday and starts seeking to recapture his youth. He meets a young woman named Vera Boye. Holmen becomes involved in an intense romance with her in a few weeks in the fall. A friend lends him an apartment, which he makes free use of to be unfaithful to his wife.

Cast
 Inger Marie Andersen: Agnete Holmen
 Arne Lie: Knut Holmen
 Anne-Lise Tangstad: Vera Boye
 Wilfred Breistrand: Jens Gunnerus
 Carsten Byhring: Holmen's friend
 Joachim Calmeyer: a doctor, Holmen's colleague
 Ingeborg Cook: Holmen's dinner guest
 Ragnhild Hiorthøy: apartment landlady
 Astri Jacobsen: Mrs. Gunnerus
 Rolf Søder: Arne Ramstad
 Ingrid Valvik: Helga
 Sverre Wilberg: waiter at the Continental
 Carsten Winger: Hagen

References

External links 
 
 Nasjonalbiblioteket: Norsk filmografi: Før frostnettene
 Filmweb.no: Før frostnettene

Norwegian drama films
1960s Norwegian-language films
Films based on Norwegian novels
Films directed by Arnljot Berg
1966 films
1966 drama films